Bakırköyspor is a Turkish sports club from Bakırköy, Istanbul. The club was founded in 1949. The colours of Bakırköyspor are green-black. Bakırköyspor played in the Turkish Super League for 3 years, but after several unsuccessful seasons, Bakırköyspor was relegated to the amateur league in the 2006–07 season. Now Bakırköyspor plays in Istanbul Super Amateur League, five levels below the Süper Lig. The club finished 8th in the 4th group in 2014-15 and 3rd in the 2nd group in 2015–16 seasons.

The home of the Bakırköyspor is Şenlikköy Stadium, which has a capacity of 8000 people. Colors of the club are green and black, which are accepted as traditional colors of the Bakırköy neighborhood.

League participations
 Turkish Super League: 1990–93
 TFF First League: 1985–90, 1993–01
 TFF Second League: 1984–85
 TFF Third League: 2001–07
 Amatör Futbol Ligleri: 2007–

Notable players
Internationally capped players
  Xhevat Prekazi
  Iosif Rotariu
  Jarosław Araszkiewicz
  Piotr Nowak
  Michael Kraft
  Fatih Akyel
  Orkun Uşak

References

External links
 Official website
 TFF website

 
Association football clubs established in 1949
1949 establishments in Turkey
Süper Lig clubs